Cossutta is an Italian surname. Notable people with the surname include:

Araldo Cossutta (1925–2017), American architect of Croatian origin
Armando Cossutta (1926–2015), Italian communist politician
Carlo Cossutta (1932–2000), Italian dramatic tenor 

Italian-language surnames